The Breakthrough Prize in Life Sciences is a scientific award, funded by internet entrepreneurs Mark Zuckerberg and Priscilla Chan of Facebook; Sergey Brin of Google; entrepreneur and venture capitalist Yuri Milner; and Anne Wojcicki, one of the founders of the genetics company 23andMe. 

The award of $3 million, the largest award in the sciences, is given to researchers who have made discoveries that extend human life. The Prize is awarded annually, beginning in 2013, with six awards given in each subsequent year. Winners are expected to give public lectures and form the committee to decide future winners. The ceremony takes place in the San Francisco Bay Area, with the symposiums alternating between University of California, Berkeley, University of California, San Francisco, and Stanford University.

Laureates

See also
 Breakthrough Prize in Mathematics
 Fundamental Physics Prize
 List of biology awards
 List of medicine awards

References

External links
 BPLS website

Academic awards
Biology awards
Medicine awards
International awards
Awards established in 2013
Life extension
Russian science and technology awards
Yuri Milner